The Severn-Trent flyway is a migratory route, or flyway, used by birds crossing Great Britain from the Humber estuary to the Severn estuary or vice versa. It follows the Humber and its tributaries the rivers Trent and Tame, then the River Severn. The last of these is not connected to the other three, and so birds must cross the gap over the West Midlands conurbation, around Birmingham.

It is used by birds migrating locally, within Britain, and by those migrating to or from Northern and Southern Europe.

Among the birds known to use the flyway are sea ducks such as common scoter (Melanitta nigra) and vagrants from North America such as lesser scaup (Aythya affinis), along with European Aythya species.

References

Sources 
 
 

Bird migration flyways
Geography of England